The Long Beach Police Department provides law enforcement for the city of Long Beach, California.

History
The Long Beach Police Department was founded January 30, 1888, on the day twenty-four-year-old Horatio Davies was elected as the city's first city marshal.

From January 1888 to January 1908, the city elected eight different men to serve as city marshal until the city council adopted Ordinance Number 3, New Series, doing away with the office of city marshal and allowing for the appointment of a chief of police.  Thomas W. Williams was the first Long Beach chief of police.

Fanny Bixby Spencer was sworn in as a special police matron on January 1, 1908, making her one of the first women police officers in the country.

The Long Beach Police Officers Association (LBPOA) was established on June 24, 1940. The Long Beach K-9 Officers Association (LBK9OA) was established in October 1982. The Long Beach Police Historical Society was founded in 1995. The Senior Police Partners program began in 1995.

The current Chief of Police is Wally Hebeish  who replaced Robert Luna who served from 2014 to 2021. Luna resigned to run for Los Angeles County Sheriff, which he was elected in 2022. 

Since the establishment of the Long Beach Police Department, 28 officers have died while on duty.

Corruption and misconduct 

In November 1979, Thomas Lee Goldstein was convicted of murder after LBPD detectives pressured witnesses to provide false information.  In August 2010, the Long Beach City Council agreed to pay Goldstein almost eight million dollars to settle the matter. He had served more than twenty years in prison.

In January 2008, LAPD Officer William Ferguson and his younger brother LBPD Officer Joseph Ferguson were convicted of charges of raiding homes in the area under the cover of their authority as police officers to steal drugs and money. Joseph was convicted of three charges and William of eighteen. They seem to have conducted about 40 such crimes.

In August, 2010, Officer Damian Ramos stole four firearms retained by the department. He later pleaded guilty.

On 25 March 2011, Officer  Eddie Sanchez pleaded guilty to DUI charges. He was found passed out at a traffic light with twice the legal limit of alcohol in his bloodstream. He was sentenced to community service and three years “informal probation.”

On 11 August 2011, Detective Erik Alvarez was sentenced to two years in state prison for sexual  contact with a female relative that began when she was fifteen years old.

In late October, 2012, Officer Brandon Preciado was sentenced to twelve years in custody for eighteen crimes relating to beating his wife.

On 23 February 2013, Officer Noe Yanez was sentenced to six years in custody for a number of charges including one count each of forcible rape, meeting a minor for lewd purposes, using a minor for sex acts, possession of child pornography, and two counts of false imprisonment by fraud or deceit.

In April 2013, Officers Jeffrey Shurtleff and Victor Ortiz were found liable in the 2010 killing of 35-year-old Douglas Zerby. Zerby was sitting on step playing with a hose nozzle. The two officers mistook the device for a gun and opened fire without warning. The jury awarded damages of six and half million dollars.

In December 2013, Detective Yvonne Robinson, a thirteen-year veteran of the department was fired when she was arrested for providing sensitive information on a murder investigation to the Baby Insane Gang.

In mid-January 2014, the department agreed to pay $380,000 to a man who was attacked by five police officers .  As a result of the agreement, the man, Perry Grays dropped a lawsuit that claimed that the officers, responding to a noise complaint, beat Grays when he asked them to provide their badge numbers.

In October 2016, a Federal jury awarded $1.6 million to Miguel Contreras and Miguel Vazquez, (two cousins). On November 27, 2010, both Sergeant David Faris and Officer Michael Hynes were accused of beating Miguel Contreras and Miguel Vazquez with batons and broke one of their hands by stomping it without provocation. Miguel Contreras and Miguel Vazquez accused Long Beach police officers of using excessive force.

In late July 2022, Miguel Vargas was released from prison after serving eleven years for assault. His conviction was called into question when officer Officer Dedier Reyes was found to have lied on other, unrelated official reports.

Patrol divisions

North Patrol Division
The North Division has approximately 110 police officers and a dedicated civilian support staff. The current building was constructed in 2004. The building houses a rooftop 40-kilowatt solar power system and has the potential to supply 85% of needed power. The North Division business desk is staffed Tuesday through Friday, 12 p.m. to 5 p.m. and provides a variety of services.

Neighborhoods served include Bixby Knolls, California Heights, Los Cerritos and North Long Beach.

South Patrol Division
The South Patrol Division encompasses the area of Anaheim Street to Harbor Scenic Drive and the Los Angeles River to Cherry Avenue. Area attractions include: Long Beach Convention Center, Long Beach Arena, Queen Mary, Carnival Cruise Line Terminal, Shoreline Marina and a Downtown Entertainment District.

Neighborhoods served include Alamitos Beach, Downtown, East Village and Hellman.

The South Patrol Division is located in the Public Safety Building at 400 West Broadway.

East Patrol Division
The East Division Station opened in February 2016 and houses the East Patrol Division and Juvenile Investigations Section operations. East Division police officers provide law enforcement services to approximately 170,000 residents. Measured at 24 square miles, the East Division is the largest geographical patrol division of the police department and comprises approximately 46 percent of the city. It is bounded by Del Amo Boulevard to the north; the Pacific Ocean shoreline to the south; Orange County to the east; and, Cherry Avenue and the City of Signal Hill to the west.

The East Division is home to 4th Street "Retro Row," Bixby Park, California State University, Long Beach, the East Anaheim Street Corridor, the Long Beach Airport, Marina Pacifica, Rancho Los Alamitos Historic Ranch and Gardens, and Towne Center.

Neighborhoods served include Alamitos Heights, Belmont Heights, Belmont Park, Belmont Shore, Bluff Heights, Bluff Park, Carroll Park, El Dorado Park, Lakewood Village, Los Altos, Naples,  Plaza, Rose Park, and Zaferia.

West Patrol Division
The West Patrol Division is almost 13 square miles and includes the Port of Long Beach, the area west of the 710 Freeway, and a large portion of Central Long Beach. The 136 sworn and three civilian employees serve almost 100,000 people. Officers respond to over 40,000 dispatches each year. The West Patrol Substation opened in late 1997. The substation's presence in the area has improved community access to police. Each divisional station provides information and limited police reporting services.

Neighborhoods served include Sunrise, West Long Beach and Wrigley.

Field support division
Field Support consists of over 200 sworn and civilian personnel.

See also
Neighborhoods of Long Beach, California

References

External links
Long Beach Police Department Official Website
Police Reporting Districts

Government in Long Beach, California
Municipal police departments of California
Organizations based in Long Beach, California
1888 establishments in California